Edward Latymer (1557–1627) was a wealthy merchant and official in London. His will established both Latymer Upper School and The Latymer School and is associated with Godolphin and Latymer School.

Life

Edward was the older son of William Latymer, a cleric who later became Dean of Peterborough. When the Catholic Mary I of England came to the throne, his father's position became untenable, and he retired to Ipswich close to the family estates at Freston. This is where Edward was born in 1557. In the next year, Elizabeth I of England came to the throne and William Latymer was restored to his former positions, and became the Treasurer of Westminster Abbey.

Edward was educated living in the Deanery at Peterborough. He went to study at St John's College, Cambridge at the age of fourteen and left in 1575 (there is no record of his graduation). There is a following gap in his records for twenty three years.

Latymer was appointed in 1594 as Deputy and Clerk to the Receiver General at the High Court, a position involving collecting monies owed. Over the next 25 years he became a man of wealth from his fees, particularly from complex inheritance cases. He purchased the Manor of Butterwick in Hammersmith, though he lived most of his adult life at 'the Signe of the Cocke' in Ramme Alley in the Parish of St Dunstan's in the City of London. In 1615, he purchased a small property in Edmonton which was a fashionable *country area of the time.

Bequest and death

He never married and did not have children, and made his will in 1625 (but was dated 1624). He gave most of his wealth to the people of Hammersmith and the Parish of St Dunstan's, today Latymer Upper School, and a less generous bequest for the Parish of Edmonton, today The Latymer School. This provided, amongst other things, clothing and education for eight poor boys of Edmonton and eight of Fulham (which then included Hammersmith). The clothing, which incorporated a red cross on the left sleeve, was to be distributed twice a year on Ascension Day and All Saints' Day, and the boys were to learn reading in English and 'God's true religion' at existing petty schools, until the age of thirteen. Separate groups of trustees administered the property on behalf of the boys in the two parishes.

The main source of this income was the rental from his property situated at Pymmes Brook on the main road to Scotland, which later became a coaching inn The Bell, and was renamed The Angel in 1780. It was demolished in 1968 through a compulsory purchase order for the widening of the North Circular Road.

Edward died in 1627 and was buried in the south aisle of St Dunstan-in-the-West, Fleet Street. His relations challenged his will in the Court of Chancery, resulting in a seven-year delay before the bequests could take effect while the case was fought.

Latimer Road, a road in Kensington, and the nearby tube station, are both named after Edward Latymer, as are Latymer Road and Latymer Way in Edmonton.

Notes

References
W. Wheatley, Edward Latymer and His Foundations

External links
British History Online

1557 births
Alumni of St John's College, Cambridge
1627 deaths
16th-century English businesspeople
17th-century English businesspeople